Pottangi (Sl. No.: 145) is a Vidhan Sabha constituency of Koraput district, Odisha, India.

This constituency includes  Damanjodi, Pottangi block, Nandapur block, Semiliguda block and 3 Gram panchayats (Litiguda, Dumuripadar and Mathalput) of Koraput block.

In 2019 election, Biju Janata Dal candidate Pitam Padhi won from this constituency.

Elected Members

Twelve elections were held between 1957 and 2014.
Elected members from the Pottangi constituency are:
2019: (145): Shri Pitam Padhi(BJD)
2014: (145): Prafulla Kumar Pangi (BJD)
2009: (145): Rama Chandra Kadam (Congress)
2004: (84): Jayaram Pangi (BJD)
2000: (84): Jayaram Pangi (BJD)
1995: (84): Rama Chandra Kadam (Congress)
1990: (84): Jayaram Pangi (Janata Dal
1985: (84): Chandrama Santa (Congress)
1980: (84): Chandrama Santa (Congress-I)
1977: (84): Jayaram Pangi (Janata Party)
1974: (84): Disari Sannu (Utkal Congress)
1961: (9): Musuri Santa Pangi (Congress)
1957: (7): Mulu Santa (Congress)

2019 Election Result

2014 Election

Summary of results of the 2009 Election

Notes

References

Assembly constituencies of Odisha
Koraput district